The Archangel Allied Cemetery is a military cemetery in Archangel, Russia, that is under the management of the Commonwealth War Graves Commission. Amongst the buried is Samuel George Pearse, an Australian soldier who received the Victoria Cross during the 1919 North Russia intervention in the Russian Civil War.

References

External links
 

Commonwealth War Graves Commission cemeteries in Russia
Cemeteries in Russia